"No New Friends" is a song by LSD from the group's album of the same name, released by Columbia Records on 14 March 2019. The song serves as the album's fifth and final single, following "Genius", "Audio", "Thunderclouds", and "Mountains".

Composition

"No New Friends" is a pop song with electronic dance music (EDM) influences, and has a "thumping" dance beat with "bouncy" synth loops by Diplo, as well as harmonized vocals by Sia and Labrinth. Jon Blistein of Rolling Stone describes the song's bridge as "reminiscent of a boozy piano ballad".

Release and promotion
Sia confirmed the song's release date via Twitter on 12 March 2019. The group performed "No New Friends" on The Ellen DeGeneres Show in April 2019.

Reception
Billboard Kat Bein described "No New Friends" as a "bright, rhythm-led tune that pops warm and sunny like spring for your ears", and "infectiously catchy with a touch of the islands that celebrates the buddies we already have". Derrick Rossignol of Uproxx called the song "upbeat" and "an ode to appreciating what you have". He wrote, "The song gives everybody a chance to shine, thanks to Sia's idiosyncratic vocals, Labrinth's hip-hop energy, and Diplo’s EDM-influenced pop production that ties everything together."

Music video
The official music video for the song was released on 16 April 2019. Rolling Stones review called the video "an appropriately fantastical visual" and described it as follows: "The clip, directed by Dano Cerny and choreographed by Ryan Heffington, stars Sia's sixteen-year-old body double Maddie Ziegler as a giant. She encounters  the pink-clad Labrinth in a Dr. Seussian land of puff-ball trees and whimsical puffy clouds, and the two quickly form a bond. They frolic through the trees, stare up at cloud formations and encounter human-sized clones of Ziegler dancing giddily on a hillside. Diplo appears later in the video as a floating sun and moon, and as another giant who towers over Ziegler."

Track listing
Digital download – Remixes
"No New Friends" (Dombresky Remix) – 4:06
"No New Friends" (Aaron Redding Remix) – 2:48

Credits and personnel 
Credits adapted from liner notes of LSD.

 Sia Furler – writer, lyricist, vocals
 Labrinth – writer, lyricist, vocals, producer, engineer, instrumentation, programming
 Diplo – writer, producer, instrumentation, programming
 King Henry – writer, producer, instrumentation, programming
 Jr Blender – writer, producer, instrumentation, programming
 Nathaniel "Detonate" Ledwidge – additional production
 Bart Schoudel – engineer
 Serban Ghenea – mixer
 John Hanes – engineer for mix
 Randy Merrill – masterer

Charts

Certifications

See also
 Diplo discography
 Labrinth discography
 Sia discography

References

External links
  (12 March 2019)
  (14 March 2019)

2019 singles
2019 songs
Columbia Records singles
LSD (group) songs
Song recordings produced by Diplo
Song recordings produced by Labrinth
Songs written by Jr Blender
Songs written by Sia (musician)
Songs written by King Henry (producer)
Songs written by Diplo
Songs written by Labrinth